Propilidium reticulatum, common name the reticulate cocculina, is a species of sea snail, a true limpet, a marine gastropod mollusk in the family Lepetidae, one of the families of true limpets.

Description

Distribution

References

Lepetidae
Gastropods described in 1885